The 1950 Cork Senior Football Championship was the 62nd staging of the Cork Senior Football Championship since its establishment by the Cork County Board in 1887.

Collins entered the championship as the defending champions.

On 8 October 1950, Garda won the championship following a 3-07 to 2-05 defeat of St. Nicholas' in the final at the Cork Athletic Grounds. This remains their only championship title.

Results

Final

Championship statistics

Miscellaneous
 Garda win their first title.

References

Cork Senior Football Championship